The Sekani language or Tse’khene is a Northern Athabaskan language spoken by the Sekani people of north-central British Columbia, Canada.

Phonology

Consonants
Sekani has 33 consonants:

Vowels

Tone
Sekani has two tones: low and high. High tone is the more common tone. Syllables phonologically marked for tone are low.

Nasalization
Nasalization of vowels is phonemic and so changes the meaning.

Sample words

In the practical writing system used here for the Kwadacha Tsek'ene dialect, u represents the mid-central vowel, and oo represents the high back rounded vowel. An apostrophe represents a glottal stop, and an ogonek under a vowel represents nasalization.

dune man; person
tlįį dog
wudzįįh caribou
yus snow
chǫ rain
k’wus cloud
kwùn fire
’įįbèh summer
too water
mun lake
nun land
tselh axe
ʼukèʼ foot
’àtse my grandfather
’àtsǫǫ my grandmother
lhìghè’ one
lhèkwudut’e two
tadut’e three
dįįdut’e four
ǫ yes
Tlįį duchę̀’ ’ehdasde January
Dahyusè’ nùkehde wìlę February
Nùtsʼiide March
ʼUtʼǫ̀ʼ kùnuyehde May
Jìje dinììdulh July
Yhììh nunutsunde wìlę August
Yhììh ukudeh’àsde September
’Udììtl’ǫh ’uwit’į̀į̀h October
Yus ’ut’į̀į̀h November
Khuye ’uwììjàh December

Notes

Bibliography

 Hargus, Sharon. (1988). The Lexical Phonology of Sekani. (Outstanding Dissertations in Linguistics). New York: Garland Publishers. 
 Mithun, Marianne. (1999). The Languages of Native North America. Cambridge: Cambridge University Press.  (hbk); .

Articles 
 Hargus, Sharon (2009) Effects on consonant duration in Fort Ware Tsek'ene. Presented at Athabaskan/Dene Languages Conference, Eugene, OR. PDF of slides, PDF of references.
 Hargus, Sharon (2009) "Causatives and transitionals in Kwadacha Tsek'ene." (slides) Presented at the Athabaskan Languages Conference, Berkeley, CA. [Supported by NSF DEL-0651853 and Kwadacha Education Society] 
 Hargus, Sharon (2009) "Phonetic vs. phonological rounding in Athabaskan languages." PDF of slides, PDF of references. Presented at LabPhon 12, Albuquerque, NM. (reposted July 16, 2010). The article will appear in Journal of Laboratory Phonology 3:163-193.

External links
 First Voices Kwadacha Tsek'ene Community Portal
 Sekani entry on First Nations Languages of British Columbia site
 Bibliography of Sekani Linguistics
 Map of Northwest Coast First Nations (including Sekani)
 OLAC resources in and about the Sekani language

Northern Athabaskan languages
Indigenous languages of the North American Subarctic
First Nations languages in Canada
Languages of the United States
Northern Interior of British Columbia
Endangered Athabaskan languages
Sekani